Oliver Sutton (died 1299) was a medieval Bishop of Lincoln, in England.

Sutton was the nephew of Henry of Lexington, Bishop of Lincoln from 1253 to 1258. He was Dean of Lincoln before 30 June 1275.

Sutton was elected to the see of Lincoln on 6 February 1280 and consecrated on 19 May 1280 at Lambeth. He was enthroned at Lincoln Cathedral on 8 September 1280.

Sutton died on 13 November 1299 at Nettleham.

Citations

Rosalind Hill, The Rolls and Register of Bishop Oliver Sutton 1280-1299 (published in eight volumes, 1948–86)

References

 
 
 

Bishops of Lincoln
1299 deaths
13th-century English Roman Catholic bishops
Deans of Lincoln
Year of birth unknown